The median sacral vein (or middle sacral veins) is a vein of the abdomen. It accompanies the median sacral artery along the front of the sacrum. It ends in the left common iliac vein. Sometimes, it ends in the angle of junction of the two common iliac veins.

References

External links 

Veins of the torso